Sheldon Brooks (May 20, 1811 – May 19, 1883) was an American physician and politician.

Brooks was born in Redfield, Oswego County, New York. He was a farmer and a physician. In 1856, Brooks moved to Minnesota and helped platted the community of Beaver, Winona County, Minnesota. He continued to farm and practiced medicine. Brooks served in the Winona County Commission and then in the Minnesota House of Representatives in 1959 and 1860. In 1862, he started a grain warehouse in Minneiska, Minnesota and was involved with the lumber business. Brooks died in Winona, Minnesota and was in failing health.

References

1811 births
1883 deaths
People from Oswego County, New York
People from Winona County, Minnesota
Businesspeople from Minnesota
Businesspeople from New York (state)
Physicians from Minnesota
Physicians from New York (state)
County commissioners in Minnesota
Members of the Minnesota House of Representatives
American city founders